"Patches" (sometimes known as "Patches (I'm Depending On You)") is a country soul song written by General Johnson and Ron Dunbar and best known as the 1970 hit version by Clarence Carter.  It won the 1971 Grammy Award for Best Rhythm & Blues Song.

Chairmen of the Board
The song was written by General Johnson, the lead singer of Chairmen of the Board, with Ron Dunbar, who worked in A&R and record production at the Invictus record label, owned and overseen by Brian Holland, Lamont Dozier, and Eddie Holland, formerly of Motown. Dunbar was often credited with co-writing hit songs at Invictus with "Edyth Wayne", a pseudonym used by Holland-Dozier-Holland during the time when they were in legal dispute with Motown and its music publishing arm Jobete to which they had been contracted.

The song tells a story about how a boy born and raised in poverty in Alabama "on a farm way back up in the woods," took over responsibility for his family from his dying father. After his father dies, he has to endure extra labor as the oldest son of the family, by farming and going to school. However, a rainstorm washes the crops away and he has to work extra hard in the fields. Years later, his mother dies and the other members of his family move away, leaving him as the man of the farm. This story, which featured spoken recitations, ends unresolved. "Patches" was included on Chairmen of the Board's first album, The Chairmen of the Board (later reissued as Give Me Just a Little More Time), and was the B-side of the group's July 1970 single, "Everything's Tuesday", their third chart hit.

Clarence Carter
The blind blues singer Clarence Carter heard the song, later saying: "I heard it on the Chairmen of the Board LP and liked it, but I had my own ideas about how it should be sung.  It was my idea to make the song sound real natural..."  Initially he thought "that it would be degrading for a black man to sing a song so redolent of subjugation,"  but was persuaded to do so by record producer Rick Hall.

Carter recorded the song at the FAME Studios in Muscle Shoals, Alabama, with Hall as producer and musicians including Junior Lowe (guitar), Jesse Boyce (bass), and Freeman Brown (drums).  Carter's recording was released in July 1970 and was described by a Billboard reviewer as a "powerful blues item" featuring a "blockbuster vocal work-out."  The record rose to No. 4 on the Hot 100, No. 2 on the R&B chart, and No. 2 on the UK singles chart.

Following Carter's success, the song won the 1971 Grammy Award for Best Rhythm & Blues Song for its writers, Johnson and Dunbar.

Chart history

Weekly charts
Clarence Carter

Ray Griff version

Jerry Reed cover

Year-end charts

Other versions
A reggae version was recorded late in 1970 by The Rudies, later known as Greyhound.  Another version by Canadian country singer Ray Griff reached #26 on the US country music chart the same year.  The song was also recorded by Alabama some time before 1980, Jerry Reed in 1982, and by George Jones and B.B. King on the album Rhythm, Country and Blues in 1994.

A parody version of the song performed by Joe Cumia, brother of Anthony Cumia of Opie and Anthony fame, titled "Black Earl" was often played on the Ron and Fez show.

Marvin

In 1984, the song was rewritten and rearranged in Portuguese as "Marvin (Patches)" by the Brazilian band Titãs and released on their self-titled debut album. The idea to adapt the song came from band member Nando Reis, who found out about the song from the cover released by reggae band King Sounds & The Israelites. The new namesake was chosen as a tribute to a recently deceased Marvin Gaye. The new lyrics tell the story of Marvin, a young farmer whose father dies, leaving him responsible for making ends meet for his family. A live version taken off their 1988 live album Go Back was released as their eighth single and a second live version, acoustic and retitled simply as "Marvin", was released on their MTV Unplugged album Acústico MTV, becoming a hit in Brazil.

Cover versions 
 Paulo Ricardo on his 1996 cover album Rock Popular Brasileiro
 Jeito Moleque on their 2005 live album Me Faz Feliz - Ao Vivo
 Biquini Cavadão on a live performance
 Grant Green on his 1971 album (released 2006) Live at Club Mozambique

See also
 List of Cash Box Top 100 number-one singles of 1970

References

1970 songs
1970 singles
1981 singles
Chairmen of the Board songs
Ray Griff songs
Jerry Reed songs
Songs written by Ron Dunbar
Atlantic Records singles
RCA Records singles
Warner Music Group singles
Songs about labor
Songs written by General Johnson (musician)
Clarence Carter songs
Songs about fathers
Cashbox number-one singles